The 2017 Wrestling World Cup - Men's Greco-Roman was held in Abadan, Iran at the Kowsar Sport Complex On March 16 to March 17, 2017.

Russia won the tournament after a three years absence of titles on the World Cups.

Pool stage

Pool A

Pool B

Medal Matches

Final classement

See also
2017 Wrestling World Cup - Men's freestyle

References

External links

 https://unitedworldwrestling.org/event/greco-roman-world-cup

Wrestling World Cup
Greco-Roman wrestling
Wrestling World Cup